Peter Odhiambo (born 11 March 1958) is a Ugandan boxer. He competed in the men's middleweight event at the 1980 Summer Olympics.

References

1958 births
Living people
Ugandan male boxers
Olympic boxers of Uganda
Boxers at the 1980 Summer Olympics
Place of birth missing (living people)
Middleweight boxers